The Shirokolashka is a river of Plovdiv Province, Bulgaria. It is a tributary of the Vacha River. Along the river are villages such as Shiroka Laka with "typically Rodopean stone houses with small windows, high chimneys and hidden trapdoors."

References

Rivers of Bulgaria
Landforms of Plovdiv Province
Landforms of Smolyan Province